Dysstroma walkerata, known generally as the orange-spotted carpet moth or marbled carpet moth, is a species of geometrid moth in the family Geometridae. It is found in North America.

The MONA or Hodges number for Dysstroma walkerata is 7188.

References

Further reading

 
 

Hydriomenini
Articles created by Qbugbot
Moths described in 1909